Franklin Raymond "Junie" Stubbs Jr. (July 12, 1909 – April 20, 1993) was an American ice hockey player who competed in the 1936 Winter Olympics.

In 1936 he was a member of the American ice hockey team, which won the bronze medal.

He graduated from Harvard University. He died in Melrose, Massachusetts.

References

External links
 
 profile

1909 births
1993 deaths
American men's ice hockey forwards
Boston Olympics players
Ice hockey players from Massachusetts
Ice hockey players at the 1936 Winter Olympics
Medalists at the 1936 Winter Olympics
Olympic bronze medalists for the United States in ice hockey
Harvard Crimson men's ice hockey players